Woerden railway station (Dutch: Station Woerden) is the railway station of Woerden, Netherlands. The railway station was opened on 21 May 1855 on the Utrecht–Rotterdam railway. In 1911 a new building was built in Jugendstil, that still exists. During 1993-1996 the railway station was modernised, replacing the wooden roof and stairways by modern ones.

During the closing decades of the twentieth century growing numbers of stopping trains at the station and a sustained rise in the level of motorised traffic led to increasing delays both for cyclists and for motorists at the level crossing directly adjacent to the station on its western side.  The matter was finally addressed early in the twenty-first century with the construction of a short section of a road tunnel under the railway lines: this replaced the old level crossing.

The station has two platforms and two entrances. On every entrance, there is bicycle parking.

Train services
The following services call at Woerden:
2x per hour intercity service Leiden - Alphen aan den Rijn - Utrecht
2x per hour local service (sprinter) Uitgeest - Amsterdam - Woerden - Gouda - Rotterdam
2x per hour local service (sprinter) The Hague - Gouda- Woerden - Utrecht - Houten - Geldermalsen - Den Bosch
2x per hour local service (sprinter) Woerden - Utrecht - Houten - Tiel

Accidents

Woerden train accident

Near the station a British furlough train derailed on 21 November 1960 killing 2 people and 10 people were injured.

Harmelen train disaster

Near the station the worst railway accident in the history of the Netherlands took place on 8 January 1962, killing 93 people.

External links
NS website 
Dutch Public Transport journey planner 

Railway stations in Utrecht (province)
Art Nouveau architecture in the Netherlands
Art Nouveau railway stations
Railway stations opened in 1855
Buildings and structures completed in 1911
Woerden
1855 establishments in the Netherlands
Railway stations in the Netherlands opened in the 19th century